{{Infobox film
| name           = Week-End at the Waldorf
| image          = WeekendAtTheWaldorf.JPG
| image_size     = 
| caption        = Theatrical release poster
| director       = Robert Z. Leonard
| producer       = Arthur Hornblow Jr.
| based_on       = 
| screenplay     = Samuel and Bella SpewackGuy Bolton
| starring       = Ginger RogersLana TurnerWalter PidgeonVan Johnson
| music          = Johnny Green
| cinematography = Robert H. Planck
| editing        = Robert J. Kern
| studio         = Metro-Goldwyn-Mayer
| distributor    = Loew's Inc.
| released       = 
| runtime        = 130 minutes
| country        = United States
| language       = English
| budget         = $2,561,000<ref name=TCM>[http://www.tcm.com/tcmdb/title.jsp?stid=1191&category=Notes Week-End at the Waldorf at Turner Classic Movies]</ref>
| gross          = $6,164,000
}}Week-End at the Waldorf, an American comedy drama film directed by Robert Z. Leonard and starring Ginger Rogers, Lana Turner, Walter Pidgeon, and Van Johnson. It premiered in Los Angeles on 17 October 1945. The screenplay by Samuel and Bella Spewack is based on playwright Guy Bolton's stage adaptation of the 1929 Vicki Baum novel Grand Hotel, which had been filmed as Grand Hotel in 1932.

Plot
The film focuses on guests staying at New York City's famed Waldorf-Astoria Hotel. Among them are lonely screen star Irene Malvern, in town with her maid Anna for a childhood friend's wedding and the premiere of her latest movie; war correspondent Chip Collyer, mistaken for a jewel thief by Irene, but playing along to catch her attention; flyer Capt. James Hollis, wounded in World War II and facing perilous surgery in three days; wealthy shyster Martin X. Edley, who is trying to sign the Bey of Aribajan to a shady oil deal; Oliver Webson, a cub reporter for Collier's Weekly hoping to expose Edley; and bride-to-be Cynthia Drew, whose upcoming wedding is endangered by her belief her fiancé Bob is in love with Irene Malvern. Also on the scene are Bunny Smith, the hotel's stenographer/notary public, who hopes to escape her low-income roots by marrying Edley; and reporter Randy Morton, who loiters in the lobby hoping to stumble upon a scoop for his newspaper.

In the opening scene, Randy Morton describes a typical Friday afternoon at the Waldorf. A newly-wed couple discover there are no rooms available and are given use of an apartment by Mr. Jesup, who is going away for the weekend. Edley tries to involve Jesup in a deal with the Bey of Aribajan, a wealthy oil sheik. Jesup refuses, but Edley knows that Jesup will be gone all weekend and has until Monday morning to get the Bey to sign a contract based on Jesup's presumed involvement.

Chip Collyer, a war correspondent, arrives for several days of rest. Before the war, Collyer had foiled one of Edley's schemes; Edley sees him, and is sure that Collyer is there to stop the deal with the Bey.

Irene Malvern, a film star, is tired of constantly working, and is unhappy that after this weekend she will immediately start on her next picture.

Edley, Collyer, Malvern, and the Bey of Aribajan are staying on the 39th Floor of the Waldorf Towers, in large apartments with terraces.

Hotel stenographer Bunny Smith is called to the suite of Dr. Robert Campbell, who has just examined Captain James Hollis, an airman with a piece of shrapnel dangerously close to his heart. Dr. Campbell dictates a letter to a doctor at Walter Reed, saying that Hollis has an even chance at surviving an operation, but he needs the will to live.

Hollis drops sheet music written by a fellow crew member who was killed on the mission. A waiter delivers it to house band leader Xavier Cugat, who suggests that he perform it on his radio show the following night at the Starlight Roof, the nightclub of the hotel.

Hollis visits the hotel stenographer's office, and asks Bunny to type up his will. He asks her to join him at dinner at the Starlight Roof to hear his friend's song performed.

Chip Collyer is approached by Webson hoping for help on the Edley story. Collyer suggests talking to the Bey of Aribajan regarding the proposed deal, and demonstrates how to sneak into the Bey's apartment by hiding in a maid's cart. Collyer is trapped in the cart when the maid returns and enters Irene Malvern's apartment to avoid being seen by Edley.

Irene Malvern's door was open because she had requested security take her jewelry to the hotel safe and station a guard outside. Earlier, her maid had admitted becoming involved with a man who intended to steal Irene's jewelry. The maid insisted that he was a good man in a difficult situation, so Irene agreed to meet him and see if this was true. When she discovers Collyer hiding in the room, she assumes he is the jewel thief; he tries to deny it. She catches him pocketing a lighter, and he recites a line from Grand Hotel in which the Baron returns the ballerina's jewels. Irene takes pity on him and allows him to sleep in the living room.

The next morning, Malvern looks in Collyer's billfold at his military identification, then confronts him. He insists that she created the misunderstanding and encouraged him to stay. Cynthia Drew, an heiress marrying Dr. Campbell, and childhood friend of Malvern's, comes to her apartment and tells her the wedding will be cancelled, she is sure that Malvern still has feelings for her fiancé. Irene convinces Cynthia that this is not true by introducing her "husband", Chip Collyer.

Cynthia tells her mother about the "secret" marriage between the film star and the war correspondent. Mrs. Drew tells Randy Morton, the newspaper columnist.

Edley has Bunny come to his apartment to dictate a contract for his deal with the Bey. He tells her that if the deal goes through, he will be moving to New York and wants to hire her as his private secretary. He tells her to attend dinner at the Starlight Roof with himself and the Bey.

Hollis is at the Starlight Roof. A note is delivered from Bunny, giving her regrets. After a performance by Xavier Cugat, he sees Bunny enter with the Bey's party. Cugat then introduces singer Bob Graham, who performs Hollis' friend's song. Bunny goes to Hollis to apologize for accepting Edley's invitation. They kiss, but Edley is looking for her.

Irene Malvern and her manager leave to go to the premiere of her new film. Afterward, Collyer has let himself into Malvern's room; Morton broke the story in the paper, and no one doubts that they are married. He presents her with law books to verify his claim that being introduced as one's spouse creates a common-law marriage. Malvern's manager persuades Collyer to sign a statement denying the existence of the marriage, but Malvern realizes that being alone is a miserable existence. Collyer comes to see her, and they make up.

Monday morning, the various parties prepare to leave the hotel. The main headline on the newspaper is Webson's story about Edley's fraudulent oil deal. Edley rushes to the Bey's apartment. Jesup has returned, and has spoken to the Bey, clarifying the situation. The Bey is revealed to speak perfect English.

Bunny Smith looks for Captain Hollis before he leaves for his surgery. She finds him, and says that she wants to come with him.

Irene Malvern is about to take a four-day train ride to California. She receives a call from Collyer at the airport. She takes the call, then rushes to the roof to wave a handkerchief at Collyer's passing plane. We last see Collyer lighting a cigarette with Malvern's monogrammed lighter.

A minor plot line concerns Randy Morton's pregnant Scottish Terrier, Suzie. During the opening scene, he struggles to find a Bide-a-Wee to take her in; in the final scene, Morton returns with Suzie and three puppies.

Cast
 Ginger Rogers as Irene Malvern
 Walter Pidgeon as Chip Collyer
 Van Johnson as Capt. James Hollis
 Lana Turner as Bunny Smith
 Edward Arnold as Martin X. Edley
 Keenan Wynn as Oliver Webson
 Robert Benchley as Randy Morton
 Leon Ames as Henry Burton
 Phyllis Thaxter as Cynthia Drew
 Warner Anderson as Dr. Bob Campbell
 Rosemary DeCamp as Anna
 Porter Hall as Stevens
 George Zucco as Bey of Aribajan
 Miles Mander as British Secretary
 Xavier Cugat as himself
 Byron Foulger as Joe (uncredited)
 Gordon Richards as Headwaiter (uncredited)

Production

The film pays homage to its source by including a scene in which Chip Collyer recreates a scene from the 1930 play based on the Vicki Baum novel, and Irene Malvern identifies it as an excerpt from Grand Hotel.

Waldorf-Astoria management wanted the film shot in color in order to show the hotel at its best advantage, a demand that almost led MGM executives to switch the locale to San Francisco and change the title to Palace in the Sky.

Mrs. Lucius Boomer, wife of the president of the Waldorf-Astoria Corporation, served as a technical advisor on the film, as did Ted Saucier, who handled public relations for the property. Some interiors and exteriors of the hotel were filmed on location, but the lobby, Starlight Roof, guest rooms, and other public spaces were recreated on the backlot of the MGM Studios in Culver City, California.

The film's theme song, "And There You Are", was written by Sammy Fain and Ted Koehler.

Box office
According to MGM records, the film earned $4,364,000 in the US and Canada, and $1.8 million elsewhere, resulting in a profit of $1,474,000.

Critical receptionVariety'' noted there is "never a dull moment in this weekend".

References

External links
 
 
 
 

1945 films
1945 comedy-drama films
American black-and-white films
Films based on Austrian novels
Films set in New York City
War romance films
Films directed by Robert Z. Leonard
Films scored by Johnny Green
Metro-Goldwyn-Mayer films
Films set in hotels
American comedy-drama films
Remakes of American films
1940s American films